Cherkasy Oblast is subdivided into districts (raions) which are further subdivided into territorial communities (hromadas).

Current

On 18 July 2020, the number of districts was reduced to four. These are:
 Cherkasy (Черкаський район), the center is in the city of Cherkasy;
 Uman (Уманський район), the center is in the city of Uman;
 Zolotonosha (Золотоніський район), the center is in the city of Zolotonosha; 
 Zvenyhorodka (Звенигородський район), the center is in the city of Zvenyhorodka.

Administrative divisions until 2020

Before July 2020, Cherkasy Oblast was subdivided into 32 regions: 26 districts (raions) and 6 city municipalities (mis'krada or misto), officially known as territories governed by city councils.
 Cities under the oblast's jurisdiction:
 Cherkasy Municipality
 Cities under the city's jurisdiction:
 Cherkasy (Черкаси), the administrative center of the oblast
 Kaniv (Канів)
 Smila Municipality
 Cities under the city's jurisdiction:
 Smila (Сміла)
 Uman (Умань)
 Vatutine municipality
 Cities under the city's jurisdiction:
 Vatutine (Ватутіне)
 Zolotonosha Municipality
 Cities under the city's jurisdiction:
 Zolotonosha (Золотоноша)
 Districts (raions):
 Cherkasy (Черкаський район)
 Urban-type settlements under the district's jurisdiction:
 Irdyn (Ірдинь)
 Chornobai (Чорнобаївський район)
 Urban-type settlements under the district's jurisdiction:
 Chornobai (Чорнобай)
 Chyhyryn (Чигиринський район)
 Cities under the district's jurisdiction:
 Chyhyryn (Чигирин)
 Drabiv  (Драбівський район)
 Urban-type settlements under the district's jurisdiction:
 Drabiv (Драбів)
 Horodyshche (Городищенський район)
 Cities under the district's jurisdiction:
 Horodyshche (Городище)
 Urban-type settlements under the district's jurisdiction:
 Tsvitkove (Цвіткове)
 Vilshana (Вільшана)
 Kamianka  (Кам'янський район)
 Cities under the district's jurisdiction:
 Kamianka (Кам'янка)
 Kaniv (Канівський район)
 Katerynopil  (Катеринопільський район)
 Urban-type settlements under the district's jurisdiction:
 Katerynopil (Катеринопіль)
 Yerky (Єрки)
 Khrystynivka (Христинівський район)
 Cities under the district's jurisdiction:
 Khrystynivka (Христинівка)
 Urban-type settlements under the district's jurisdiction: 
 Verkhniachka (Верхнячка)
 Korsun-Shevchenkivskyi (Корсунь-Шевченківський район)
 Cities under the district's jurisdiction:
 Korsun-Shevchenkivskyi (Корсунь-Шевченківський)
 Urban-type settlements under the district's jurisdiction:
 Stebliv (Стеблів)
 Lysianka (Лисянський район)
 Urban-type settlements under the district's jurisdiction:
 Lysianka (Лисянка)
 Mankivka  (Маньківський район)
 Urban-type settlements under the district's jurisdiction:
 Buky (Буки)
 Mankivka (Маньківка)
 Monastyryshche  (Монастирищенський район)
 Cities under the district's jurisdiction:
 Monastyryshche (Монастирище)
 Urban-type settlements under the district's jurisdiction:
 Tsybuliv (Цибулів)
 Shpola (Шполянський район)
 Cities under the district's jurisdiction:
 Shpola (Шпола)
 Smila  (Смілянський район)
 Talne  (Тальнівський район)
 Cities under the district's jurisdiction:
 Talne (Тальне)
 Uman (Уманський район)
 Urban-type settlements under the district's jurisdiction:
 Babanka (Бабанка)
 Zhashkiv (Жашківський район)
 Cities under the district's jurisdiction:
 Zhashkiv (Жашків)
 Zolotonosha  (Золотоніський район)
 Zvenyhorodka  (Звенигородський район)
 Cities under the district's jurisdiction:
 Zvenyhorodka (Звенигородка)

References 

Cherkasy
Cherkasy Oblast